Peters Brook is a tributary of Stony Brook in Mercer and Hunterdon counties, New Jersey in the United States.

Course
It flows northeast, crossing Rock Road East and CR-579 (Linvale-Harbourton Road).

Sister tributaries
Baldwins Creek
Duck Pond Run
Honey Branch
Lewis Brook
Stony Brook Branch
Woodsville Brook

See also
List of rivers of New Jersey

References

External links
USGS Coordinates in Google Maps

Rivers of Mercer County, New Jersey
Rivers of Hunterdon County, New Jersey
Tributaries of the Raritan River
Rivers of New Jersey